Southampton Central railway station is a main line station serving the city of Southampton in Hampshire, southern England. It is on the South West Main Line and also serves the Wessex Main Line and the West Coastway Line.

The station is managed by South Western Railway who operate the majority of services, including frequent trains to London Waterloo, Bournemouth and Portsmouth Harbour. Other operators are CrossCountry (providing services to Oxford, Birmingham New Street, Manchester Piccadilly and Newcastle), Great Western Railway (to Bristol Temple Meads and Cardiff Central) and Southern, which links Southampton to London Victoria, East Croydon, Gatwick Airport and Brighton.

History

Southampton Central station was opened as Southampton West in 1895, to replace the smaller nearby West End station (originally named Blechynden when it opened in 1847). The station was on the seafront, specifically the stretch of water known as West Bay, with the water reaching right up to the southern edge of the platforms at high tide. A series of land reclamation projects to expand the docks, largely funded by the London and South Western Railway, culminated in the building of the vast "New Docks" (now Western Docks) between 1927 and 1934, which led to all of West Bay being reclaimed and the station becoming landlocked. The new land and the demand for new lines allowed the station to be enlarged and redeveloped in 1934–1935 (from two platforms to four), and it became 'Southampton Central'. The new station buildings were largely constructed from concrete in the art deco style.

An air raid on 23 November 1940, damaged the buildings alongside platform one. The station was hit by two German parachute mines on 22 July 1941, which destroyed the ticket hall on platform four and damaged the island platform.

In preparation for the closure of Southern Terminus station near the docks in 1966, alterations were made to the station's parcel handling facilities to allow it to handle increased volume. In 1967, soon after the closure of Southampton Terminus, the station was rebuilt, losing its clocktower which was replaced with an office block. At this point it was renamed 'Southampton', although in 1994 was once again renamed to 'Southampton Central'.

A partnership between Network Rail, South West Trains and Southampton City Council saw a £3million investment in the refurbishment of the station entrances and improved passenger facilities which was completed in 2012.

Platform layout
All the platforms are split into two sections, A at the east and B at the west, allowing two services to occupy a platform at the same time, or to allow for trains dividing into two portions or attaching to make one train. This dual use occurs throughout the day on platforms 2 and 3, and in peak hours on platforms 1 and 4.

Platforms 1 and 4 are side platforms facing the fast lines. These platforms accommodate CrossCountry's Manchester to Bournemouth services (as well as an extension of the Reading to Newcastle service); Great Western Railway's Cardiff to Portsmouth route; and fast services to London Waterloo operated by South Western Railway.

Platforms 2 and 3 are on an island, facing the slow lines. On these platforms call services on South Western Railway's Romsey to Salisbury local service, its service to Portsmouth & Southsea, and its stopping services to London Waterloo. Southern services to London Victoria and Brighton also start from these platforms.

There is also an ex-Red Star Parcels bay on the Bournemouth end of platform 4. Previously numbered as platform 5, stopping services to Brockenhurst used this platform, but the platform can no longer be used for passenger services due to the lack of a proper starting signal. It is now used for the stabling of spare units. Up and down goods loops are located a short distance to the west of the station. These allow terminating trains to clear the platforms for through services if required, and also to allow passenger services to pass freight or empty coaching stock trains.

Services

 can be reached from Southampton Central using trains departing in both directions, by South Western Railway via  in the up direction and by South Western Railway and Great Western Railway via  in the down.

At the station, South Western Railway offer the following in their normal Monday to Friday off-peak service pattern:
 1 express train per hour between London Waterloo and 
 1 express train per hour between London Waterloo and 
 1 stopping train per hour between Southampton Central and /
 1 train per hour on Romsey - Chandler's Ford - Southampton Central -  - Romsey -  route in both directions

Southern offer the following in their normal Monday to Friday off-peak service pattern:
1 train per hour between Southampton Central and Brighton
1 train per hour between Southampton Central and London Victoria

Great Western Railway offer the following in their normal Monday to Friday off-peak service pattern:

1 train per hour between Cardiff Central to Portsmouth Harbour

CrossCountry offer the following in their normal Monday to Friday off-peak service pattern:

1 train per 2 hours between Bournemouth and Manchester Piccadilly
On 9 December 2007, a number of changes were made to South West Trains, First Great Western and Southern services.

The  to  shuttle and the Salisbury to Southampton Central portion of the First Great Western  to Southampton Central service were replaced by a South West Trains  to Romsey via Southampton Central and Chandlers Ford service, which calls at Romsey twice on its journey.

Connections 

As well as services to the wider area, there are bus services connecting the station to:

 the city centre
 the Isle of Wight Red Funnel and Blue Funnel ferries
 the National Oceanography Centre
 Southampton Airport
 the University of Southampton's Highfield Campus

Notes

References

External links 

 
 Eighty years since Southampon West station became Southampton Central (28 December 2015)

Railway stations in Southampton
DfT Category B stations
Former London and South Western Railway stations
Railway stations in Great Britain opened in 1895
Railway stations served by CrossCountry
Railway stations served by Great Western Railway
Railway stations served by Govia Thameslink Railway
Railway stations served by South Western Railway
Buildings and structures in Southampton